The common slug snake, Assam snail eater, Assam snail-eater snake, or montane slug-eating snake  (Pareas monticola) is a species of snake found in Northeast India (Sikkim, Assam, Meghalaya, Mizoram, Darjeeling, Arunachal Pradesh), eastern Nepal, Bhutan, China (Tibet, Yunnan), Myanmar, and Vietnam. Its type locality is "Naga Hills, Asám" (=Assam), India. It is also reported from north-eastern and south-eastern Bangladesh. The species was first described by Theodore Cantor in 1839.

Pareas monticola is a nocturnal and arboreal snake that typically occurs in low vegetation and preys on slugs and snails.

References 

Pareas
Snakes of Asia
Reptiles of Bhutan
Snakes of China
Reptiles of India
Reptiles of Myanmar
Reptiles of Nepal
Snakes of Vietnam
Reptiles described in 1839
Taxa named by Theodore Edward Cantor